The Dead Horse EP is a remix EP by Junior Boys containing remixes of tracks from their 2006 album So This Is Goodbye. It was released on April 10, 2007, and includes remixes by Hot Chip, Tensnake, Carl Craig, Kode9 and Marsen Jules.

Track listing
"In the Morning (Hot Chip remix)" (Junior Boys, Andi Toma) – 9:45
"FM (Tensnake remix)" (Junior Boys) – 7:18
"Like a Child (Carl Craig remix)" (Junior Boys) – 10:39
"Double Shadow (Kode 9 remix)" (Junior Boys) – 6:29
"FM (Marsen Jules remix)" (Junior Boys) – 5:16

References

2007 debut EPs
Junior Boys albums
Domino Recording Company EPs
Remix EPs